In physics, electron emission is the ejection of an electron from the surface of matter, or, in beta decay (β− decay), where a beta particle (a fast energetic electron or positron) is emitted from an atomic nucleus transforming the original nuclide to an isobar.

Radioactive decay

 In Beta decay (β− decay), radioactive decay results in a beta particle (fast energetic electron or positron in β+ decay) being emitted from the nucleus

Surface emission

 Thermionic emission, the liberation of electrons from an electrode by virtue of its temperature
 Schottky emission, due to the:
 Schottky effect or field enhanced thermionic emission
 Field electron emission, emission of electrons induced by an electrostatic field

Devices

 An electron gun or electron emitter, is an electrical component in some vacuum tubes that uses surface emission

Others
 Exoelectron emission, a weak electron emission, appearing only from pretreated objects
 Photoelectric effect, the emission of electrons when electromagnetic radiation, such as light, hits a material

See also
 Positron emission, (of a positron or "antielectron") is one aspect of β+ decay
 Electron excitation, the transfer of an electron to a higher atomic orbital

References

Physical phenomena